A Russian concept of information war against Ukraine was first enunciated by Valery Gerasimov in 2013 to describe a Western information war that he believed Russia needed to counter. He believed that color revolutions and the Arab Spring had been instigated by Western governments, and posed a threat to the Russian Federation. His definition reflected his assessment of Western involvement in these events, particularly in the 2011–2013 Russian protests.

"Informatsionnaya voyna" includes cyberwarfare, usually framed as technical defenses to technical attacks in warfare, but only as one of many strategies. Russia's information war continuously seeks strategic victory and reflexive control through tools as diverse as undersea communications cables, national origin stories, control of the news cycle, or polluting an information space with Russian bots and trolls.

In part due to censorship, which has effectively shut down all but government-controlled media in Russia, Kremlin messaging has largely succeeded in convincing the citizens of the Russian Federation to support its approach in Ukraine. The Kremlin denies waging war in Ukraine, saying it just wants to protect Russian speakers in Ukraine against Ukrainian Nazis. A full 58 percent of Russians polled between February 28 and March 3 approved. Russian television had been claiming for eight years that Ukrainian Nazis posed a threat to Russia, giving the narrative a "first-mover advantage, reinforced by repetition and familiarity."

Ukraine communicates with its population as well, but also with other governments and populations, portraying itself as indomitable and unafraid, but in need of weapons. "Ukraine's online propaganda is largely focused on its heroes and martyrs, characters who help dramatize tales of Ukrainian fortitude and Russian aggression." Such stories are spread not only by Ukraine's leaders but also by citizens using social media. Ukraine's strategy includes comedy, and teaching skepticism of Russian narratives.

Background

Gerasimov, chief of the General Staff of the Armed Forces of the Russian Federation, describes a novel type of warfare that incorporates elements of propaganda, demoralization, distraction and political posturing in both peace and times of war, and above all the importance of social media, beyond both cyberwarfare and information war as NATO understands them, He suggested a 4:1 ratio of nonmilitary to military measures. Nonmilitary tactics also come under the military in Russia, and although United States Marine Corps research suggests that the ratio is still largely aspirational, it indicates recognition of "the utility of nonmilitary measures in interstate confrontation, especially during what would be considered peacetime."

The Russian Federation misinforms and misleads its citizens and the audience of its television channels in other countries - Channel One Russia and Russia-24 for example.

Reasons for the conflict

Identity
Like Ukraine, Belarus and Russia both consider Kievan Rus their cultural ancestor, part of a shared past. Many Russians see Kyiv as the birthplace of their nation. Kievan Rus' reached its greatest extent under Yaroslav the Wise (1019–1054); his sons issued its first written legal code, the Russkaya Pravda, shortly after his death. In the 2000s, Russia waged a large-scale propaganda campaign in Ukraine, based on the doctrine of 
"Russian world", and Putin said "...we are one nation. Kiev is the mother of Russian cities." Its ideological basis was post-Soviet revanchism in the Russian Federation for the cultural, economic, and territorial restoration of pre-1991 borders and the restoration of the former Soviet "zone of influence" in Europe and Asia.

This revanchism sees three categories of the world's population as "Russian": ethnic Russians, regardless of where they live; a Russian-speaking population regardless of nationality; compatriots who have never lived on the territory of the Russian Empire, the USSR and other state entities, as well as their descendants.

At the 2008 Bucharest summit April 2–4, 2008, Putin told United States President George W. Bush: "You understand, George, that Ukraine is not even a state! What is Ukraine?"

Also, many Russians idealize Soviet Russia, the rule of the Communist Party as a time of prosperity, and the ruling United Russia party as heir to the country's "glorious past." Since the collapse of the USSR, Russian politicians have talked about restoring Russia's influence in post-Soviet countries.
"According to Vladimir Bukovsky, a dissident who spent a decade in Soviet prisons before his exile to the West in 1976, Vladimir Putin is totally genuine when he says that the disintegration of the Soviet Union was a "geopolitical catastrophe"."

Putin sees the growing number of NATO members in Eastern Europe as an "existential threat", and has written that Russia and Ukraine are really one country. This revanchism focuses on Ukraine, whose withdrawal from the USSR led to its collapse. "Russia is restoring its unity—the tragedy of 1991, this terrible catastrophe in our history, has been overcome," exulted RIA Novosti, Russia's main state online news agency, on February 26, 2022. The Putin regime contrasts "ours" and "others" in Ukraine, and suggests that violence against "others" is desirable and even required.

The Russian government frames its hybrid war as a conflict between Russia and NATO, but while geopolitics and its desire for a post-Soviet sphere play into its focus on Ukraine, so do its domestic politics. An independent Ukrainian democracy might inspire Russians to demand the establishment of their own democracy and "perhaps even challenge Mr. Putin's authoritarianism."

History of the war
In June 2014, the Ukrainian National Security and Defense Council of Ukraine (NSDC) DC obtained materials used to train Russian information war specialists. They instructed Russian soldiers to "actively influence the consciousness and system of knowledge and ideas of the target country," according to NSDC Secretary Andriy Parubiy.

Propaganda targeting the Russian people themselves, justifying a future war against Ukraine, appeared even before Russia's first incursion into Ukraine in 2014. In 2009, Maxim Kalashnikov's "Independent Ukraine: Failure of a Project" portrayed Ukraine as a Yugoslavia on the verge of an ethnic breakup. Novels such as Fyodor Berezin's "War 2010: Ukrainian Front", Georgiy Savitsky's "Battlefield Ukraine: The broken trident" and Alexander Sever's "Russian-Ukrainian Wars" posited a war against Ukraine. According to activists, Russia has also waged an information war against Ukraine through cinema.

Kremlin-run media in 2014 created the impression in Crimea that "fascists, anti-Semites and extremists" were in power in Kyiv and chaos ruled the rest of Ukraine, but this had "little or nothing to do with reality."

Since Ukraine's independence, Russia has waged a constant information war against Ukraine, especially under the pro-Russian President Victor Yanukovych. In February 2014, for example, Russians flatly denied that their military maneuvers in any way threatened Ukraine:  "These were local self-defense forces," Putin said of the men who tried to seize the Crimean parliament.

Information operations

Censorship

In February 2017, the Russian Minister of Defence acknowledged the existence of "information operations forces" in Russia. In 2021, Open Media, VTimes, and the Moscow bureau of Deutsche Welle was shut down.

A Russian law signed on 4 March 2022 provides drastic penalties for spreading "false information" or protesting the war or "discrediting" Russia's actions in Ukraine. Russian schools also must follow the official narrative.
After the 2022 legislation made it illegal to publish information on the Ukrainian war that the Kremlin deems "false", some Western media withdrew their reporters out of concern for their safety. Independent Russian media outlets that shut down in the wake of the law included Dozhd (TV-Rain) and Novaya Gazeta, whose editor received the Nobel Peace Prize in 2021. News website Znak announced its closure, and Ekho Moskvy, owned by Kremlin-linked Gazprom, also shut down. The websites of Deutsche Welle, the BBC, Meduza and Radio Free Europe became inaccessible from within Russia without a VPN.
News sites Mediazona, Republic,  and Agentstvo were also blocked from the Russian internet after the law passed, and only available by VPN.

Russia also jammed commercial broadcast signals and penetrated both civilian and military communications networks.

Cyberwarfare

Telecommunications
Russia's Leer-3  drone system can listen to or suppress cellular communications, and even send text messages to front-line soldiers. Ukrainian soldiers have received texted jeers and threats from the Russians on their cell phones, and family members of Ukrainian soldiers have also reported receiving calls saying that those soldiers were dead. The Russian Orlan-10 has also been extensively used in electronic warfare in Ukraine.

However, tactical communications have been an issue for the Russian military, to the point where some troops in Georgia received their orders from an Air Force officer who arrived by helicopter. Then-president Dmitry Medvedev ordered an expansion of the military's radio system in 2009, with a contract to a manufacturer partially owned by a former Medvedev advisor. The contract was subsequently troubled by embezzlement allegations.

Internet infrastructure

On March 9 internet service provider  suffered an outage in Kharkiv and other cities caused by a factory reset of several of its devices. Recovery efforts were hampered by shelling in the area at the time, which made it dangerous to go on-site and may have damaged internet connectivity. Attackers had previously disrupted its connectivity and DNS routing on February 24. National telecoms operator Ukrtelecom in late March also suffered, then recovered from, a major cyber-attack.

In Russia, as of March 14, peering agreements were still in place but new regulation was expected to ban web hosting outside Russia and require the use of official DNS servers. Transit providers Lumen and Cogent both left Russia after the invasion in early March, but this had a limited effect on the Russian internet connectivity because they continued to peer with some of the larger Russian ISPs, such as Rostelecom and Rascom, at exchanges outside Russia.

War propaganda 

Information warfare has deep roots in Russia. In addition to presenting a Russian narrative and version of events, it strives to cause confusion and cast doubt on the idea of truth. Russia transmits war propaganda through news media in its ongoing war against Ukraine. As early as September 2008, Alexander Dugin, a Russian fascist known as "Putin's brain," advocated an invasion of Ukraine and other countries that had previously been part of the USSR: "The Soviet empire will be restored. in different ways: by force, diplomacy, economic pressure ... Everything will depend on place and time."

On 28 February 2022 RIA Novosti published, then took down, an incorrect report that Russia had won the Russo-Ukrainian War and "Ukraine has returned to Russia". On 14 March, Marina Ovsyannikova, an editor at Channel One, interrupted a live broadcast to protest the Russian invasion of Ukraine, carrying a poster that said in Russian and English: "Stop the war, don't believe the propaganda, here you are being lied to." RT, a Russian state-controlled television network, was officially banned in the European Union and suspended by television service providers in several other countries. YouTube blocked RT and Sputnik across Europe to prevent Russian disinformation. Many RT journalists resigned after Russia invaded Ukraine.

Russian teachers received detailed instructions on teaching the invasion of Ukraine. The Mayakovsky Theatre in Moscow received a government email "to refrain from any comments on the course of military actions in Ukraine", warning that any negative comments would be "regarded as treason against the Motherland".

The Russian government uses the "Z" symbol as a pro-war propaganda tool, Russian civilians as a sign of support for the invasion.

The Guardian'''s Pjotr Sauer says many Russians still support Putin and don't believe the "special military operation" in Ukraine has to do with propaganda and disinformation disseminated by the Russian government. Polls conducted by the Levada Center between 17 and 21 February found that 60% of respondents blamed the US and NATO for escalating tensions, while only 4% blamed Russia. Similarly, a telephone survey conducted by independent researchers from 28 February to 1 March found that 58% of Russian respondents approved of the military operation. However, a series of four online polls by Alexei Navalny's Anti-Corruption Foundation found that between 25 February and 3 March, the share of respondents in Moscow who considered Russia an "aggressor" increased from 29% to 53%, while the share of those who considered Russia a "peacemaker" fell by half from 25% to 12%.

Some observers noted what they described as a "generational struggle" among Russians over perception of the war, with younger Russians generally opposed to the war and older Russians more likely to accept the narrative presented by state-controlled media in Russia. Kataryna Wolczuk, an associate fellow of Chatham House's Russia and Eurasia programme, said, "[Older] Russians are inclined to believe the official narrative that Russia is defending Russian speakers in Ukraine, so it's offering protection rather than aggression." Russian opposition politician Alexei Navalny said the "monstrosity of lies" in the Russian state media "is unimaginable. And, unfortunately, so is its persuasiveness for those without access to alternative information."

On 12 March, YouTube announced it had blocked an unspecified number of media outlets controlled by the Russian state, including RT and Sputnik, citing YouTube policy, that prohibits content that "denies, minimizes, or trivializes well-documented violent events". On 18 March, the British media regulator Ofcom revoked RT's broadcasting licence. On 2 April, it was reported that Putin's approval rating in Russia had risen to 83% a month after the invasion, from a 69% approval rating as prior to the invasion during the height of the COVID-19 pandemic.

The state-controlled television channels, through which most Russians consume news, presented the invasion as a liberation mission and accused Ukrainian troops of attacking civilian targets. Mediazona, a Russian independent media outlet, reported that the FSB had fabricated a video of a woman accusing Ukraine of war crimes in Mariupol. Mediazona also shared screenshots of what it said were emails from the FSB to media outlets, instructing them to not say where the video came from.

In an op-ed published in the Russian state outlet RIA Novosti, Timofei Sergeytsev openly advocated the "purification" of Ukrainians, blurring the lines between the Ukrainian government, military, and civilians, then the cultural genocide of Ukraine through the obliteration of the Ukrainian name and culture, and finally the reeducation of the remaining civilians together with a strict regime of censorship in order to incorporate them in a greater Russia.

Alexei Navalny tweeted in April 2022 that "warmongers" among Russian state media personalities "should be treated as war criminals".
On 13 April 2014, NATO Secretary-General Anders Fogh Rasmussen, in a statement posted on the alliance's website, accused Russia of promoting war and wanting to overthrow Ukraine. In early 2022 the United States government warned that Russia was planning a false flag operation to invade Ukraine, and pointed to "a pattern of Russian behavior" that included invading and occupying parts of Georgia in 2008, and noted Russia's "failure to honor its 1999 commitment to withdraw its troops and munitions from Moldova, where they remain without the government's consent." In 2014, Vladimir Putin called opponents of the war nothing more than "traitors" and a "fifth column".

Children's television has also broadcast war propaganda, as when Phil the dog joined the army in 2014 to become "a real defender".

The throttling of information into Russia also impedes the Kremlin's own information diet. The Center for Strategic and International Studies wrote in 2022 that the Ukrainian invasion "bears an eerie resemblance to Soviet decision making in 1979 to invade Afghanistan," poor intelligence, misreading the international reaction, over-optimism, incomprehension of the costs.

 Control of news outlets

Public relations
Russia has learned to use respected Western media like BBC News, Reuters, and AFP to promote anti-Ukrainian propaganda. These media outlets were unprepared for the Russian-Ukrainian war in 2014, and often became unintentional distributors of Russian anti-Ukrainian propaganda.How Putin made the international media his unwitting accomplices. atlanticcouncil.org. 1 April 2021. In English

Russia has also learned to skillfully use Western PR companies to disseminate the narratives it needs in the interests of various Russian government institutions and private corporations.

The Kremlin has instructed official Russian television outlets to rebroadcast Tucker Carlson's show “as much as possible.”Kremlin memos urged Russian media to use Tucker Carlson clips – report: Russian government document instructed outlets to show Fox News host ‘as much as possible’, Mother Jones says, Martin Pengelly. 14 March 2022 Marjorie Taylor Greene has also gotten approving coverage on Kremlin media, as when she said that the US was responsible for the 2014 overthrow of the Russian puppet government in the Ukrainian Revolution of Dignity.

Ukraine

Many Ukrainian news outlets are financed by wealthy investors. Some of these investors have close ties to Russian political power. This highly concentrated ownership of Ukrainian media has set a high barrier to entry for the market. 
Four financial-political groups control nearly all broadcasting in Ukraine.

The top 20 most-viewed TV channels almost all belong to Ukraine's wealthiest oligarchs: 
Rinat Akhmetov, richest man in Ukraine; supports the Opposition Bloc, successor of the Party of Regions, the party of President Viktor Yanukovych, ousted in 2014. He reportedly controls Media Group Ukraine. 
Viktor Pinchuk - owner of four TV channels and a popular tabloid, Fakty i Kommentarii. Has been a member of the Ukrainian parliament
Dmytro Firtash described as a “Kremlin influence agent in Ukraine;” with his business partner Serhiy Liovochkin, affiliated with openly pro-Russian Opposition Platform – For Life, led by Viktor Medvedchuk Denies having ties to crime boss Semion Mogilevich
Serhiy Liovochkin - ran Office of the President of Ukraine for Yanukovych 
Igor Kolomoisky - 1+1
Petro Poroshenko
Viktor Medvedchuk, often referred to as a grey cardinal of Ukraine, important voice of the Kremlin there, put under house arrest on 13 May 2021, allegedly supported and funded by the Kremlin. Owner of First Independent TV channels, 112 Ukraine and ZIK.
Yevhen Murayev's NewsOne and Nash TV essentially replaced Medvedchuk's pro-Russian outlets and received the same funding.Alternatively Pro-Russian: How NASH Operates: The NASH news network controlled by Murayev has taken the place of the banned TV channels of Medvedchuk. It mostly features the same guests and similar messages, Ukraine World, April 26, 2021

A decline in advertising revenues has left media outlets even more dependent on support from politicised owners, hence hindering their editorial independence. Paid content disguised as news (known as jeansa) remains widespread in the Ukrainian media, weakening their and journalists' credibility, especially during electoral campaigns.

Media ownership remains opaque, despite a February 2014 bill requiring full disclosure of ownership structures.
 Inter Media Group is linked to gas trader Dmytro Firtash and Yanukovych-linked politician Serhiy Lyovochkin. The channel is part of GDF Media Limited since Dmytro Firtash bought 100 percent of InterInter Media Group Limited (back) from Valeriy Khoroshkovskyi on 1 February 2013. 
 StarLightMedia, linked to the billionaire Viktor Pinchuk, includes six television and several other media and advertising companies.
 1+1 Media Group is deemed owned by Ihor Kolomoyskyi, who in March 2014 was appointed governor of Dnipropetrovsk.
 5 Kanal TV channel remains owned by the former President of Ukraine, Petro Poroshenko, despite criticism of the conflict of interest.
 UMH group, once controlled by Serhiy Kurchenko
internet publications strana.ua, and Альтернативно проросійський: як працює телеканал «НАШ». radiosvoboda.org. 2 травня 2021

Other oligarch-owned media outlets:
Rinat Akhmetov
Media Group Ukraine
youth entertainment TV channel NLO-TV
News channel , national FTA TV channel
thematic TV channels Football 1, Football 2, Football 3
regional TV channel Channel 34
Segodnya Multimedia
telecom Ukrtelecom
SCM Holdings Akhmetov has been its sole proprietor since 2009.
Landline business Vega Telecom
Russian-language newspaper Segodnya has drawn criticism for coverage allegedly favoring certain politicians and public figures, say journalists at the paper.Kyiv Post, 16 December 2011, Akhmetov: Segodnya newspaper must become stronger.

Russia

Russian media have been used for propaganda to persuade domestic and world audiences. Among the best-known are Sputnik, RT (formerly RussiaToday), RIA Novosti, Life (formerly LifeNews).Russia profile - Media, BBC. 26 April 2012
Updated 8 June 2021

Employees of Russian news outlets have been resigning since the 2022 incursion into Ukraine: “English-language RT staff member and one frequent RT contributor in Moscow have quit the network in recent days over the editorial position on the war, the Guardian has learned.” Zhanna Agalakova, a correspondent for two decades for Pervy Kanal (Channel One) in New York and Paris, announced in March that she was leaving over the invasion. Liliya Gildeyeva, an anchor on the state-run channel NTV, also resigned.  Marina Ovsyannikova has been hired by the German media company Die Welt, a month after she drew worldwide attention for bursting onto the set of a live broadcast on Russian state television to protest the war in Ukraine.

 RT 
RT is an important Russian weapon in the information war. In 2014, John Kerry, then United States Secretary of State, called it a state-sponsored "propaganda bullhorn". Its audience in 2015 was 700 million people in more than 100 countries.  In 2012, RT had the highest government spending per employee in the world, $183 thousand per person.

As of 2014, Russia had spent more than $9 billion on its propaganda. In 2021, it increased the state media budget to 211 billion rubles (about $2.8 billion), 34 billion rubles ($460 million) more than the previous year.

Russian interference with Ukrainian media
On March 6, 2014, "1 + 1" and Channel 5 in the territory of the Autonomous Republic of Crimea were turned off and Russia 24 captured the broadcasting frequencies of Crimea's private "Chernomorskaya TV and Radio Company". In Simferopol, state television and radio broadcaster Krym was also blocked by people in camouflage uniforms. General Director Stepan Gulevaty called the police, but they did not respond.

On March 6, 2014, an Internet poll on the ATR TV website found that most respondents opposed the annexation of Crimea. The next day Russian military in Crimea disconnected the ATR website. They also shut down the analogue broadcast signal of the Ukrainian TV channel Inter, on the frequencies of which NTV is broadcast.

On August 10, 2014, the German provider Hetzner Online AG sent a letter of apology to Glavkom. The provider had previously moved to block Glavkom at the request of the Russian Roskomnadzor for publishing material about the March for the federalization of Siberia.

In July 2019, Hetzner Online warned The Ukrainian Week that the site would be blocked until "extremist content" was removed. The provider received a request for this from Roskomnadzor, which considers the 2015 material on Right Sector a violation of Russian legislation.

For several months, DDoS attacks were carried out against Ukrainian information sites: Censor.NET, Tizhden.ua, Ukrayinska Pravda and others, as well as the website of the Ministry of Internal Affairs of Ukraine, with the appearance of ads for V. Yanukovych. Similarly, in January 2022 Ukrainian cyber official Victor Zhora reported attacks on over 90 websites of 22 government groups on January 14, 2022. About 50 websites were vandalized while the remainder
suffered some damage.

 Methods and resources 
 Disinformation 

Russia uses disinformation both to support an image of its greatness and importance — or of the weakness of its enemies — or sometimes to deny its actions.

Kyiv “hasn’t been bombed by anyone” Channel One pundit Artyom Sheynin assured viewers on February 24, 2022, for example. Also on February 24, “explosions and gunfire were heard through the day in Ukraine's capital and elsewhere in the country, with at least 70 people reported killed,” according to Reuters. Most Russians get their information from television, although younger Russians tend to prefer online sources. These now require a VPN connection, making the truth now “mostly is discovered by people who already distrust the Kremlin and its state-sponsored media.”

The untethering of the Russian news diet from facts doesn't just affect the populace. The Kremlin has been described as: 

Other more subtle attacks, known as reflexive control, systematically distort and reinterpret words, leading "extremists" to become an accepted description for independent journalists and human rights activists, or peaceful demonstrators to be arrested as security threats.

 Falsehood and adamant denial 
"You could spend every hour of every day trying to bat down every lie, to the point where you don't achieve anything else. And that's exactly what the Kremlin wants," says Greg Pryatt, former US ambassador to Ukraine.:59

 2014 
In November 2013, the pro-Russian Ukrainian president Viktor Yanukovych blocked the legislatively approved course towards European integration, and the Revolution of Dignity began. Putin "used disinformation to lay the groundwork to annex Crimea in 2014, and to support continued fighting in Ukraine's Eastern provinces of Donetsk and Luhansk," wrote Forbes contributor Jill Goldenziel. Again in 2022, Kremlin propaganda had the goal of preparing world public opinion for the invasion of Ukraine.

In 2014 Putin for quite some time denied sending troops into Ukraine. He later said Russia was "protecting" the Russian-speaking population of Ukraine. When Russia invaded Georgia in 2008, it gave many alternative explanations for its actions there as well, and denied having plans to attack it. In 2014 Putin again denied his invasion, despite photos of military vehicles there from the North Caucasus Military District One car had forgotten to camouflage an icon of the Guards Division. The soldiers also carried the Dragunov self-loading sniper rifle), only used by the Russian military.

In March 2022, Russians said they had found evidence at the decommissioned Chernobyl nuclear power plant that Ukraine was working on a nuclear bomb. Experts scoffed at the claim, which they said was both impossible with the fuel there and not how anyone would run a secret weapons program.

 Malaysia Airlines Flight 17 
The most fake tweets in a day, or on a single topic, by Russian disinformation agency Internet Research Agency (IRA), following the shooting down of the Malaysian MH17 airliner. Russia took extensive measures and gave many narratives to hide its involvement.Why Russia loves banging on the 'fake news' drum, Nathan Hodge. CNN, February 4, 2022

In three days after the crash, the Russian Internet Research Agency posted 111,486 tweets from fake accounts, mostly in Russian. At first they said that Russian-backed rebels downed a Ukrainian plane; later tweets said Ukraine had shot the airliner down. RT quoted a Twitter account purportedly of an air traffic controller named Carlos who said he had seen Ukrainian fighter jets following the airliner Supposedly Ukraine mistook the airliner for the Russian presidential jet. In August 2015 Komsomoloskaya Pravda published a wiretap transcript of two named CIA operatives planning the MH17 attack, ridiculed for English that recalled "Google translated Russian phrases read from a script".

On December 20, 2017, the Intelligence and Security Committee of the British Parliament in a report specifically emphasized that Russia had waged a massive information war with intense, multi-channel propaganda to convince the world that Russia did not shoot down the plane.

 2022 

In 2022 Russia insisted it was merely conducting military exercises on the Ukrainian borders, then declared that it needed to protect Russian speakers in eastern Ukraine. Russia also amassed troops at the Ukrainian border with Belarus and held naval exercises in the Black Sea and Sea of Azov, which Kyiv called "an unjustified complication of international shipping", that made navigation "virtually impossible". On February 15, 2022, Russia said it would "partially pull back" from Ukraine's borders, but according to the US, in fact sent additional troops. "We can't really take the Russians for their word" said Canadian ambassador to the United Nations Bob Rae, after Russia resumed shelling within hours of announcing a ceasefire for civilian evacuation.

After shelling a nuclear power plant complex in Zaporizhzhia, the Kremlin said its military seized it "to prevent Ukrainians and neo-Nazis from 'organizing provocations'".

Tropes

Since the collapse of the USSR, Russia has circulated propaganda and disinformation to demonize Ukrainians. Neo-Nazis play a recurring role in Russian propaganda; in 2022 to justify military "denazification." In Mariupol, Russians were told in 2022, Ukrainians fired on Russian soldiers despite the cease-fire, and according to TASS neo-Nazis were "hiding behind civilians as a human shield."

According to Kacper Rękawek, a postdoctoral fellow with the Center for Research on Extremism at the University of Oslo, simultaneously portraying Ukrainians as fascists and depraved pro-gay liberals, as opposed to the solid conservative values of Russian speakers in eastern Ukraine, has roots in a  longstanding narrative of politicians both in and outside Ukraine that ties Ukrainian speakers in Western Ukraine to far-right nationalists who fought against Soviets in World War II.

Russia "has an extensive network of allies and front organizations, and reconstructs reality and rewrites history to legitimize itself and undermine others", says a 2018 article in Nature.

In the early 1990s, the first such propaganda tropes presented events with the phrases "after the collapse of the USSR", and "with the collapse of the USSR", to create the impression that these phenomena arose because of the collapse of the USSR, and not the reverse.
Propaganda tried to portray Ukraine as economically and politically bankrupt as a state. In 2009 Russia accused Ukraine of "stealing Russian gas".

Ukrainian figures have been allegedly quoted making provocative statements. A criminal case was brought against the leader of the Ukrainian Right Sector, Dmytro Yarosh, for supposedly publishing an appeal to Dokka Umarov to carry out terrorist attacks in the Russian Federation. A day later authorities announced that the "appeal" had been the work of hackers.

In the same way as Russian propaganda sought to portray its swift victory as inevitable against incompetent Ukrainian commanders, Russian media also sought to create fear and loathing with stereotypes of its own Chechen fighters.

Social media

In 2022 government groups posed as independent news entities and created fake personas on Facebook, Instagram, Twitter, YouTube, Telegram and also the Russian-language Odnoklassniki and V Kontakte, to disseminate Russian narratives, such as the alleged helplessness of Ukrainians and videos of their fighters surrendering.

According to The Washington Post, in 2014 the Russian military intelligence (GRU) created more than 30 pseudo-Ukrainian groups and social media accounts, as well as 25 "leading English-language" publications. Posing as ordinary Ukrainians, intelligence operatives concocted news and disseminated comments to turn pro-Russian citizens against the protesters.

In early 2016 Ukrainian journalists discovered a network of dozens of social media groups, run from Moscow on multiple social media, that used nationalist rhetoric to undermine the Ukrainian government and mobilize protesters.

 Access to social media 

 MSNBC reported in October 2017 that Russian information warfare operatives "reported" the Facebook posts of Ukrainian activists, baselessly claiming that they were pornography or another regulated type of message.
 On July 14, 2014, Facebook blocked the page "Book of Memory of the Fallen for Ukraine", after warning that the content of some messages "violate(d) Facebook standards". They were primarily messages about the death of Ukrainian soldiers from the OZSP NSU "Azov".
On March 5, 2022, Russia blocked access to Facebook and Twitter, in response to their freezes and bans on Russian state-owned media. A few days later it announced it would block access to Instagram.

 Attempts to censor Russian Wikipedia 

Ever since the early 2010s, Russian Wikipedia and its editors have experienced numerous and increasing threats of nationwide blocks and country-wide enforcement of blacklisting by the Russian government, as well as several attempts to Internet censorship, propaganda, and disinformation, more recently during the 2014 Russo-Ukrainian war in the Donbas region and the 2022 Russo-Ukrainian War.

In February and March 2022, the first week after the Russian invasion of Ukraine and break out of the Russo-Ukrainian War, Russian Wikipedia editors warned their readers and fellow editors of several, reiterated attempts by the Putin-led Russian government of political censorship, Internet propaganda, disinformation, attacks, and disruptive editing towards an article listing Russian military casualties as well as Ukrainian civilians and children due to the ongoing war.

On March 11, 2022, Belarusian political police (GUBOPiK) arrested one of the most active users of Russian Wikipedia Mark Bernstein for "spread of anti-Russian materials", violating the "fake news" law  after being doxxed on Telegram.

In April–July 2022, the Russian authorities put several Wikipedia articles on their list of forbidden sites, and then ordered search engines to mark Wikipedia as a violator of Russian laws.

 Timeline 

 2014 

During and before its annexation of Crimea and encroachment into Donetsk and Luhansk with AstroTurf rebellions, Russia demonized Ukrainians in the eyes of the Russian and international communities.

January 21 - Protesters received text messages saying that they were "registered as a participant in the mass disturbances." Cell service providers denied sending the messages, but two of them were owned by Russian companies. Experts suggested state actor involvement.

February 2014
Protests in Ukraine
Overthrow of Yanukovych - Ukrainian President Viktor Yanukovych elected to accept  Russian foreign aid rather than join the EU, and violent protests broke out. Yanukovich fled Kyiv. The Ukrainian Parliament decided that he had abdicated and removed him from office.
Yanukovych called the vote a coupViktor Yanukovych urges Russia to act over Ukrainian ‘bandit coup’: Deposed president says Crimea should remain part of Ukraine and expresses surprise at Vladimir Putin's restraint, Shaun Walker. The Guardian, 28 Feb 2014
Russian foreign minister Sergey Lavrov said that "illegal extremist groups" had taken control in Kyiv. This and similar language frequently recurred in the ensuing years.Russia: Don't Trust Ukraine's Opposition, Natalya Krainova. The Moscow Times,
Feb. 23, 2014 
Parliament appointed Alexander Turchinov acting president pending an election scheduled for May.
 19 February - Russian Ministry of Foreign Affairs referred to Euromaidan revolution as "Brown revolution" and Euromaidan protesters as "rampant thugs."

20 February - Russians enter Crimea
 According to Russian media, Euromaidan supporters brutalized a  bus convoy of anti-Maidan activists on the night of February 20–21, 2014 in  Korsun-Shevchenkivskyi, Cherkasy Oblast, burned several buses, and killed seven passengers. On April 3, 2014, occupation forces in Crimea said seven people had died and 30 had gone missing. Amnesty International, Human Rights Watch and the local police force all questioned the accuracy of this account. However, Putin said this story was the reason for the military operation in Crimea, and the alleged killings of anti-Maidan activists near Korsun were later reflected in the Russian pseudo-documentary Crimea. The Way Home.
 February 27, 2014 - Russian soldiers seize Crimean Parliament

Sergey Aksyonov installed
Putin gives multiple versions of Russian participation
Donetsk People's Republic separatist Igor Girkin said in January 2015 that Crimean members of parliament were held at gunpoint, and forced to support the annexation of Crimea.

March 2014

 March 2, 2014, Russian media reported that Ukrainian saboteurs shot at a crowd and the House of Trade Unions near the Crimean Cabinet in Simferopol. The masked saboteurs were armed with modern Russian weapons, including the latest GM-94 grenade launcher, and the "victims" of the attack were unharmed.
March 18 - Annexation of Crimea
 March 19 - Russian media reported the arrest of a 17-year-old Lviv sniper in Simferopol the day before, killing an APU serviceman Sergei Kokurin and a Russian mercenary. No further information about the 17-year-old sniper was given, but Igor Girkin later admitted that his unit was responsible. (See also: 2014 Simferopol incident)
 On March 24, 2014, several media outlets reported that the deputy commander of the Kerch Marine Battalion, had written a statement about joining the Russian army. However, he went to the mainland and studied at a Ukrainian military university.

April 2014
Russia annexes Crimea. 
The Donetsk People's Republic and Luhansk People's Republic secede.
 April - Oleg Bakhtiyarov arrested in a plot to storm Ukraine's parliament and Kyiv Cabinet of Ministers building. He recruited some 200 people, paid them each $500 to help, and stockpiled petrol bombs and tools. Bakhtiyarov arranged for Russian TV channels to film the incident, then blame it on Ukrainian radicals.
Vitaliy Yarema said that Russian Special Forces units, including the 45th Parachute Guards Regiment from Moscow, were operating in Kramatorsk and Sloviansk. On 16 April, 450 Russian special forces troops were said to be there.
 On April 27, 2014, Russian media aired a story about "EU concentration camps in Ukraine." Construction began at the site in 2012, under pro-Kremlin Viktor Yanukovych, an EU-funded project to detain illegal migrants.
 On April 29, 2014, Russian news agency ITAR-TASS called a brutal attack by a pro-Russian mob on a peaceful Ukrainian march in Donetsk as "[Ukrainian] radicals attacked thousands of anti-fascist marchers."
 In June 2014, after the capture of Nadezhda Savchenko, Russian TV channels NTV and Channel 5 aired a misleading sound bite in a LifeNewd interview with Nastya Stanko from a soldier named Volodymyr Kosolap, an Aidar Battalion fighter from Shchastia. Russian media presented him as a "punisher" from a barricading detachment, ordered to shoot anyone who did not want to kill members of pro-Russian armed groups. In the full video of June 16, 2014, Kosolap said that he would have shot any Aidar fighter who tried this. LifeNews took this sound byte out of context.

April–May 2014: Sloviansk

April 12, 2014 - former Russian military officer Igor Girkin took Sloviansk in Donbas

May 2014 - Ukrainians attack

Russia broadcaster Channel One falsely claimed Ukrainian soldiers tortured and crucified a three-year-old childThere's No Evidence the Ukrainian Army Crucified a Child in Slovyansk: GRISLY FABRICATION, Anna Nemtsova, Daily Beast, updated July 12, 2017, first published July 15, 2014
 On July 15, 2014, the English-language Russian broadcaster Voice of Russia published an article in which pro-Russian militants attributed the killing of Pentecostals in Slovyansk to "Ukrainian nationalists," twisting the words of Anton Gerashchenko, then a government spokesperson. The killings have since been attributed to Donetsk separatists.A Ukrainian murder mystery ensnares a church in former rebel stronghold: That pro-Russia separatists kidnapped and murdered four members of a Pentecostal church in Slaviansk seems sure. But very little else about the incident is, Scott Peterson, Christian Science Monitor. August 12, 2014
 In May 2014, a television commercial surfaced that was created in the autumn of 2013 for a Russian Defense Ministry recruitment campaign. The video was criticized for promoting war and the account that had posted it was removed from Vimeo. (It is now only posted on YouTube).
May 25 - Oligarch Petro Poroshenko wins Ukrainian presidential election
Summer 2014, Azov helped retake MariupolThe scars of Ukraine's war in Mariupol, Christian F. Trippe. Deutsche Welle, July 27, 2016 (in English)

July–August 2014
 In late July-early August 2014, a video of Bohdan Butkevich of Tyzhden was widely publicized, allegedly calling for the killing of 1.5 million Donbas residents. The video was a rough snippet which completely distorted the meaning of what he said.
August 2014 - Ukrainian government blocked 14 Russian TV channels to stop them from spreading war propaganda.
 August 2014 - captured Russian special forces from the 331st regiment of the 98th Svirsk airborne division say they crossed the border by accident. Ukrainian spokesman  said: "This wasn't a mistake, but a special mission they were carrying out."
 August 2014 - The Ukrainian government bans a number of Russian news outlets for broadcasting war propaganda.

October 
October 2014 - Pravda and Izvestia accused Right Sector of terrorizing the Jewish community of Odessa and beating more than 20 people. Mikhail Maiman, quoted by Izvestia, was fictional, and there had not been a single incident of violence.
 October 24 - CyberBerkut claims to hack electronic vote counting system, Ukraine's CEC website
 October 28 - Russian intelligence and security services were behind a plot. to create a people's republic in Odessa, said the SBU, which also said it had found a munitions cache and arrested the alleged separatists.

December
December 2014 - Ukrainian Ministry of Information  created to counteract "Russian propaganda"; Reporters Without Borders say that "In a democratic society, the media should not be regulated by the government."

 2015 
January–February 2015
28 January on the outskirts of Khartsyzk, east of Donetsk - the OSCE observed "five T-72 tanks facing east, and immediately after, another column of four T-72 tanks moving east on the same road which was accompanied by four unmarked URAL-type military trucks." as well as intensified movement of unmarked military trucks, covered with canvas.
January - After the shelling of residential areas in Mariupol, NATO's Jens Stoltenberg said: "Russian troops in eastern Ukraine are supporting these offensive operations with command and control systems, air defence systems with advanced surface-to-air missiles, unmanned aerial systems, advanced multiple rocket launcher systems, and electronic warfare systems."
 February 9 - Artillery shell causes explosion at a chemical plant in Donetsk.
 February 12 - Minsk II accords signed 
 February 15 - Minsk II ceasefire took effect
 February 16 - Minister of Foreign Affairs of Ukraine Pavlo Klimkin said pro-Russian forces fired on Ukrainians over 100 times in the past day. Separatists accuse Ukrainians of violating the ceasefire.
 February 17 - Rebels conquered most of Debaltseve and encircled 10,000 Ukrainian troops in the area. Rebels claimed the town was not part of the recently established ceasefire.

March 2015
 On March 23, 2015, Russian outlets broadcast a news story about a 10-year-old girl allegedly killed by Ukrainian shelling in the Petrovsky district of Donetsk. BBC correspondent Natalia Antelava discovered in Donetsk that the story was Russian propaganda. She asked Russian media employees about the girl's death, and they replied that "she is not here anymore" and that no one was killed. When asked about the news stories they answered that they had been "forced".

June 2015
June 22 - European sanctions against Russia because of its actions in Crimea and eastern Ukraine. Kremlin calls them “unfounded and illegal.”

 2016 
 Oxford Dictionaries named the term "post-truth" the word of the year.
 In April 2016 the Internet Research Agency released a video claiming that an advertising sign in New York's Times Square had been hacked to show an image of Vladimir Putin winking. The video was fake.
 On December 12, 2016, the press centre of the Special Operations Forces of Ukraine reported that unauthorized information resources appeared with symbols and photo materials of the Special Operations Forces of the Armed Forces of Ukraine that might provide distorted or unverified information.
 On December 13, 2016, Russian media preliminarily accused Ukraine of gas theft.
 On December 22, 2016, American cybersecurity company CrowdStrike released a report according to which Russian hackers from the Fancy Bear group monitored the location of APU D-30 howitzers through an Android application written by Ukrainian gunner Yaroslav.

2017
May 2017 - Poroshenko blocked access in Ukraine to Russian servers for VKontakte, Odnoklassniki, Yandex and Mail.ru, claiming they participated in an information war against Ukraine.

July 2017 -Putin signed a bill, which took effect 1 November 2017, banning software and websites to circumvent internet filtering in Russia, including anonymizers and Virtual private network (VPN) services.

2018
Kerch Strait incident - EU Commissioner for Security Sir Julian King said that prior to the incident Russia had spread rumours:
that the Ukrainians were dredging the Azov Sea to prepare for a NATO fleet
that Ukraine planned to infect the Black Sea with cholera
that it planned to blow up the Crimean Bridge with a nuclear bomb

2019

April 2019
Volodymyr Zelenskyy elected

2021

May 11, Viktor Medvedchuk and fellow Opposition Platform — For Life lawmaker Taras Kozak named suspects for high treason and illegal exploitation of natural resources in Ukraine's Russian-annexed Crimea.
13 May - Viktor Medvedchuk put under house arrest and fitted with an electronic tracking device.
May 2021 - Russian authorities began liquidating the Russian company Novye Proekty allegedly used by Medvedchuk for his alleged illegal exploitations in Crimea. In 2021, Poroshenko was named as a co-suspect in the criminal case against Medvedchuk.
November 2021 - Zelenskyy accused Rinat Akhmetov of helping to plan a coup by Russia in Ukraine.Ukraine has uncovered Russian-linked coup plot, says president Volodymyr Zelenskiy says there is evidence of ‘coup d’état’ being planned for early December, Patrick Wintour. The Guardian, 26 November 2021 Akhmetov called the allegations "an absolute lie." Zelenskyy later said the plot had tried to enlist Akhmetov but without success.
 December 2021 - Mythos Labs found 697 accounts tweeting Russian disinformation about Ukraine, vs. 58 in November, 2021. The number of Ukraine-related tweets by these accounts soared 3,270% from September to December

 2022 

 January 
6 January - Assets of former president Poroshenko frozen as part of Ukrainian proceedings for high treason.
22 January - United Kingdom announced it had intelligence of planned Russian coup in Ukraine

February
 "Russian-backed forces are already shelling targets in the east, as Moscow's propaganda organs blame the violence on the Ukrainian government."
 3 February - TV channel NewsOne banned by presidential decree. Since then, NASH has taken the place of the banned pro-Russian TV channels.
 18 February - Donetsk People's Republic and Luhansk People's Republic, the separatist areas of eastern Ukraine involved in the War in Donbas, broadcast an urgent appeal for citizens to evacuate to Russia. Investigation showed that the messages were pre-recorded.
February 21 - United States president Joe Biden warned of an impending invasion of Ukraine
February 28 - Google turns off live traffic updates for Ukraine out of safety concerns for users.

March
March - Azov Battalion fighting Russian invaders in Mariupol
March 1 - Russians deploy vacuum bomb at a Ukrainian army base in the northeastern town of Okhtyrka, killing 70 soldiers.
 March 4 - Russia blocks access to the BBC and Voice of America from within Russia, as well as Deutsche Welle and Radio Free Europe.Russia restricts access to several Western media websites: Russian communications watchdog restricts access to sites including BBC, Deutsche Welle and Radio Free Europe following request by prosecutors, Al-Jazeera, March 4, 2022
 March 9 - Mariupol hospital airstrike Four died.Pregnant woman, baby die after Russian bombing in Mariupol, Mstyslav Chernov, Associated Press, March 14, 2022 Russian forces deny this event happened. Twitter removed a tweet by the Russian embassy in London to this effect, calling it disinformation.
 March 9–22 bombs defused in Chernihiv, according to Ukrainians, who released images of what appears to be 500lb FAB-500s.
 March 13 - Russians shell Chernihiv. 
 Mariupol theatre airstrike
  March 14 - Marina Ovsyannikova, an editor for Channel One Russia, interrupted the state television's live broadcast to protest against the Russian invasion of Ukraine, carrying a poster stating in a mix of Russian and English: "Stop the war, don't believe the propaganda, here you are being lied to."
 March 16 - TASS says Mariupol theater was blown up by Azov Battalion
 March 16 - Russian spokesman Igor Konashenkov denied that Russian forces had killed 10 civilians queuing for bread, calling footage of the event a “hoax launched by the Ukrainian Security Service”; ”No Russian soldiers are or have been in Chernihiv. All units are outside of the Chernihiv city limits, blocking roads, and are not conducting any offensive action,” he said.
 March 16 - Two adults and three children were killed in Russian shelling in Chernihiv.
March 16 — Colonel-General Mikhail Mizintsev said Moscow would “turn to international organizations” because, it said, Ukraine was holding Ukrainians hostage in Kyiv, Kharkov, Chernihiv and Sumy rather than allowing them to travel to the Russian Federation.
March 17 - Russia's ambassador to the United Nations denied bombing a theatre in Mariupol that had been serving as a bomb shelter.
March 17 - Russian media (Pravda) said that three members of the Tennessee National Guard, all relatives, had been killed while fighting as mercenaries in Ukraine. The guardsmen had been home for more than a year.
March 21 - Ukrainian media reported a missile strike on Kyiv's Retroville Shopping Mall. Russian media released drone footage allegedly showing an MLRS system stationed near the mall.

 Staged videos 

 On July 22, 2015, the head investigator of the Lugansk Prosecutor General's Office, Leonid Tkachenko, said that a warehouse of American weapons had been discovered during the excavation of debris near Luhansk airport. The video allegedly showed army boxes and an American Stinger MANPADS. Analysis of the video found that the "Stinger" was a poorly built prop made of welded plumbing pipes. The markings on it came from the video game Battlefield 3, including the identification number and the errors in the English. The fake was distributed by Russian media, in particular Komsomolskaya Pravda, RIA Novosti and TV-Zvezda.
 On January 18, 2016, on the eve of the Dutch referendum on the EU-Ukraine Association Agreement, Russian sources circulated a video of Azov Battalion fighters allegedly burning the flag of the Netherlands and threatening to commit terrorist acts there if the agreement was not approved. Bellingcat concluded that the video was a forgery and distributed if not created by the Kremlin-linked Internet Research Agency in St Petersburg.
 Another video released by the Donetsk People's Republic (DNR) and CyberBerkut had links to the IRA. The Defense Intelligence Agency considers Cyberberkut a front for the Kremlin's internet activities, and the Kremlin maintained plausible deniability as to the activities of the IRA by bankrolling it through Yevgeny Prigozhin, known as "Putin's chef". It accused Ukraine's Azov Battalion of fighting alongside ISIS militants. Photos and videos made by the pro-Russian militants showed armed men wearing ISIS and Azov symbols firing on industrial buildings. The BBC identified the buildings as hangars at the Isolation mineral wool plant in Donetsk, which in 2011 was converted into an art space, the Isolation art project, then seized in June 2014 by pro-Russian militants.
 On July 23, 2018, a video spread through the Russian media alleged that a special unit of the Security Service of Ukraine (SBU) stormed the base of Ukrainian volunteers using armoured personnel carriers. The video then purported to show the SBU beating them. As early as July 25, the video was exposed as fake: the SBU uniform had outdated elements and insignia; the armoured personnel carrier had white identification lines in a form that had not been used for a long time, as well as anti-accumulation grilles, which the SBU does not put on its equipment. The actors who played SBU special forces spoke with a foreign accent, threw around emotional phrases about hatred for Bandera members and unprofessionally pretended to kick the volunteers. On September 11, an armoured personnel carrier was filmed in Donetsk. On September 20, the location of the staged assault was identified — the grounds of the abandoned Reaktiv chemical plant in occupied Donetsk.
 On August 16, 2018, a video of the alleged brutal detention of a person at a Ukrainian checkpoint was published on a YouTube channel with no subscribers or other videos. The video was distributed among the Russian occupation forces, in particular through the Lost Armor website. The Ukrainian mil.in portal published a debunking. The appearance of all Ukrainian checkpoints (Majorca, Marinka, Gnutovo, Stanitsa Luhanskaya, as well as Chengar and Kharkiv) was analyzed, and none of them matched the video. There were few cars and practically no people, untrue of any of the checkpoints. License plate numbers were also falsified. The video purported to show a rebel fighter attempting to surrender under the SBU “Waiting for you at home" program, which offered amnesty to fighters who returned to a peaceful life. Since the video showed the purported fighter on the ground being kicked, it may have been an attempt to discredit the program and reduce attrition in the rebel forces.
 During the Russian invasion in March, videos were discovered purporting to show Ukrainian-produced disinformation about strikes inside Ukraine which were then "debunked" as some other event outside Ukraine. However, this may be the first case of a disinformation false-flag operation, as the original, supposedly "Ukraine-produced" disinformation was never disseminated by anyone, and was in fact preventive disinformation created specifically in order to be debunked and cause confusion and mitigate the impact on the Russian public of real footage of Russian strikes within Ukraine when it eventually got past Russian-controlled media. According to Patrick Warren, head of Clemson's Media Forensics Hub, "It's like Russians actually pretending to be Ukrainians spreading disinformation. ... The reason that it's so effective is because you don't actually have to convince someone that it's true. It's sufficient to make people uncertain as to what they should trust."
 On March 14, 2022, a video was released purporting to show a helicopter attacking a Russian convoy, resulting in the destruction of military aircraft and tanks. Upon further analysis, the footage was revealed to have been produced using the Arma 3 video game.
 On March 16, 2022, a one-minute deepfake video aired on the website of the Ukraine 24 television channel. In it, Zelenskyy appeared to tell Ukrainian soldiers to surrender. Ukraine 24 said they had been hacked, but Russian social media boosted it. Zelenskyy immediately disavowed the video and responded with one of his own, and Facebook and YouTube began to remove it. Twitter allowed the video in tweets discussing the fake but said it would be taken down if posted deceptively. Hackers inserted the disinformation into the live scrolling-text news crawl. It was not immediately clear who created the deepfake.This deepfake of Zelenskyy went viral. Let it be a warning to us all: Officials spotted a fake video purporting to show Ukraine's president surrendering. We may not be so lucky next time, Ja'han Jones. MSNBC, March 17, 2022

 Results

On November 23, 2016, the European Parliament passed a resolution opposing Russian propaganda. Putin responded by calling the work of the Russian news agencies RT and Sputnik effective.

2022
On March 1 YouTube blocked channels connected to RT and Sputnik across Europe, then worldwide on March 11 due to its insistence that Russia was not waging war in Ukraine. Roku and DirectTV also dropped RT.

Countermeasures
No precise equivalent appears to exist to the systemic Russian 
disinformation campaign, although Ukraine and other interested parties have used speeches, television appearances, social media, cyber warfare and viral memes against Russia. Not all of these actions can be attributed with certainty, but the United States has deployed soft power on Ukraine's behalf, at least one self-identified Anonymous account has claimed to have damaged Russian infrastructure, and a number of official Ukraine social media accounts have successfully created a favorable narrative.

The U.S. government, suspecting a buildup to a false flag attack, released its intelligence findings about Russian troop movements before the invasion began, undermining the posited plans to blame an attack on Ukraine; "the U.S. government was very forthcoming...there wasn't an information vacuum that the Russians could step in and fill" explained researcher Laura Edelson.

Ukraine on the other hand has created a narrative of Ukrainian bravery and indomitability. 

On 5 April 2022, Russia's opposition politician Alexei Navalny said the "monstrosity of lies" in the Russian state media "is unimaginable. And, unfortunately, so is its persuasiveness for those without access to alternative information." He tweeted that "warmongers" among Russian state media personalities "should be treated as war criminals. From the editors-in-chief to the talk show hosts to the news editors, [they] should be sanctioned now and tried someday."

Zelenskyy

Zelenskyy's speeches have repeatedly gone viral and galvanized the Ukrainian population. An underdog hero tackling evil forces attacking him is an ancient human narrative as fundamental and continuing as Gilgamesh and Luke Skywalker, and Zelenskyy has told it masterfully. Wearing a green military t-shirt,Pundit ripped for criticizing Zelensky's attire for address, Judy Kurtz. The Hill, March 16, 2022 he passionately appealed for help for his people in fiery virtual speeches to the parliaments of Canada, the United Kingdom and the European Union, as well as a joint session of the U.S. Congress, to a standing ovation each time.

He has spoken to the Russian people directly, in Russian, his first language. Also in Russian, he positioned himself on March 3 as a "neighbor" and an "ordinary guy", needling Putin for recently receiving his visitors at an extraordinarily long table: 

Putin's previous shirtless photo-ops sought to position him as a strong and virile leader. Images of the younger Zelenskyy wearing body armor and drinking tea with Ukrainian soldiers starkly contrasted with news broadcasts of Putin in rococo and very socially distanced The body armor photo was taken in 2021, and he actually drank tea with the soldiers a few days before the invasion began, but the images were real if out of context, and the pictures of Putin at an enormously long table, apparently for fear of COVID-19, were also real.

Official Ukrainian social media accounts have sought to bolster support for efforts against the invasion and spread information, with targeted posts and videos used to recruit soldiers and call for international aid. Some media analysts have highlighted the Ukrainian officials' methods as beneficial.
Several academics, including Professors Rob Danish and Timothy Naftali, have highlighted Zelenskyy's speaking ability and use of social media to spread information and draw upon feelings of shame and concern while building kinship with viewers. Real-time information about the invasion has been spread by online activists, journalists, politicians, and members of the general population, both in and out of Ukraine.

 Propaganda in other countries 
Chinese diplomats, government agencies, and state-controlled media in China have used the war as an opportunity to deploy anti-American propaganda,Russia-Ukraine war: In Chinese media, the US is the villain: In tightly-controlled media space, conflict is an opportunity for Beijing to advance its ‘information proxy war’., Rachel Cheung. Al Jazeera, 6 Apr 2022 and they have amplified conspiracy theories created by Russia, such as the false claims that public health facilities in Ukraine are "secret US biolabs". Such conspiracy theories have also been promoted by Cuban state media.

Russian propaganda has also been repeated by the state-controlled outlets of other countries such as Serbia and Iran. In Iran, the state media criticised the British embassy in Tehran after it raised the Ukrainian flag in support of Ukraine. Reports from Sputnik have been actively republished by Iran's pro-regime media. In Latin America, RT Actualidad is a popular channel that has spread disinformation about the war. Authorities in Vietnam have instructed reporters not to use the word "invasion" and to minimize coverage of the war. In South Africa, the governing African National Congress published an article in its weekly newsletter ANC Today endorsing the notion that Russia had invaded Ukraine to denazify it.

Memes

Also shot on February 25, a video of an elderly woman scolding a Russian soldier appears to record an actual event in Henichesk. She gave him sunflower seeds so sunflowers would grow when he died.Brave Ukrainian women's tells Russian soldier: 'Put sunflower seeds in your pocket so they grow when you die.', Shweta Sharma, The Independent, February 25, 2022

The wildly popular social media legend, Ghost of Kiev, "a Ukrainian fighter pilot who shot down six Russian planes cannot be confirmed", said Deutsche Welle on March 1. The story was tweeted by the official Ukraine account and authenticated by former Ukrainian President Petro Poroshenko but the photo of the pilot posted by Poroshenko turned out to be three years old. The story's factuality has been questioned by both Russian and Western media. The Ukrainian military has not verified it, for one thing, and some of the images were definitely repurposed from elsewhere. But on February 25, the Ministry of Defence of Ukraine suggested that "The Ghost of Kyiv" might be a returning reserve pilot, so they did not deny it either.

The defiant response of a Ukrainian border guard stationed at Zmiinyi (Snake Island) began a Ukrainian framing of the war as David vs. Goliath, which the videos of Ukrainian farmers towing off abandoned Russian tanks have helped to continue.

Some Ukrainians say that the many memes that have circulated since the war began have helped them to cope with their uncertain future by making them laugh. Citizen contributions can also serve the more serious purpose of combatting disinformation, says Daniel Johnson, a Roy H. Park Fellow at UNC Hussman's School of Journalism and former U.S. Army journalist. "It's hard to lie when I have 150 videos showing that you're not in Kyiv and you're not winning," he said.

 See also 

Economy of the Soviet Union
Firehose of falsehood
Media portrayal of the Ukrainian crisis
Russian military deception
Russian disinformation since 2000
Russian web brigades
Russians in Ukraine
Dzhokhar Dudayev Battalion
Russian–Ukrainian cyberwarfare
International sanctions during the Russo-Ukrainian War (2014)
Russia–Ukraine relations
Russo-Ukrainian War
Television in Ukraine
Timeline of the 2014 pro-Russian unrest in Ukraine 
Ukraine–European Union relations
War crimes in the 2022 Russian invasion of Ukraine
2014 Russian sabotage activities in Ukraine
Russian allegations of fascism against Ukraine

Bibliography

 A. Bondarenko, N. Kelm, R. Kulchynsky, N. Romanenko, J. Tymoschuk (А. Бондаренко, Н. Кельм, Р. Кульчинський, Н. Романенко, Я. Тимощук,), У нас погані новини (We have bad news) // Texty.org.ua, November 28, 2018 (in Ukrainian)
 Petro Bukovsky (Петро Бурковський), Як «Страна.ua» зображає Україну агресором // Детектор медіа, (How Strana.ua portrays Ukraine as an aggressor) // Media Detector, July 4, 2018 (in Ukrainian)
 Georgy Chizhov, Pro-Kremlin influence in the Ukrainian media (in English) // The Kremlin's influence quarterly - Free Russia Foundation, 2020
 Olena Churanova (Олена Чуранова), Копіпаст російської пропаганди в українських новинах // Детектор медіа, (Copypaste of Russian propaganda in Ukrainian news) // Media Detector, October 17, 2018 (in Ukrainian)
 Gai-Nyzhnyk PP, Росія проти України (1990—2016): від політики шантажу і примусу до війни на поглинання та спроби знищення (Russia v. Ukraine (1990-2016): from the policy of blackmail and coercion to the war of takeover and attempts at destruction). МП Леся (MP Lesya), 2017. 332pp. ISBN 978-617-7530-02-1 (in Ukrainian)
 Roman Hardel (оман Хардель), Википедия как инструмент влияния на историческое сознание в контексте русско-украинской информационной войны // Sdirect24, (Wikipedia as a tool for influencing historical consciousness in the context of the Russian-Ukrainian information war) (in Russian) // Sdirect24, March 2, 2019
 Volodymyr Ivakhnenko (Володимир Івахненко), «Задача — посеять сомнения». Почему Украина обвиняет Россию во лжи // Радіо свобода, ("The task is to sow doubts": Why Ukraine accuses Russia of lying) // Radio Liberty, 18 December 2018 (in Russian)
 Konakh VK (Конах В. К.), Сучасні тенденції в захисті національних медіапросторів від російської пропаганди (Modern tendencies in protection of national media spaces from Russian propaganda) // Strategic priorities. (Стратегічні пріоритети). National Institute for Strategic Studies (Національний інститут стратегічних досліджень), 2016, v.38. ISSN 2306-5664 
 Kurban OV (Курбан О. В.), Інформаційне супроводження російської гібридної агресії в Донбасі (2014—2016) (Information support of Russian hybrid aggression in Donbass (2014-2016)) // Nauk. Journal "Library Science. Documentation. Informology." 2017, No. 2. S. 66-73
 Lazorenko OA, Інформаційний складник гібридної війни Російської Федерації проти України: тенденції розвитку (Information component of the hybrid war of the Russian Federation against Ukraine: development trends). Strategic priorities (Стратегічні пріоритети). National Institute for Strategic Studies (Національний інститут стратегічних досліджень), 2015. Vol. 36. No.3, 2015. ISSN 2306-5664. (In Ukrainian) 
 Фейки об Украине: о чем российские издания лгали в 2017 году // Крим.Реалії, (Fakes about Ukraine: what Russian publications lied about in 2017) (in Russian) // Krym.Realii, January 2, 2018
 G. Pocheptsov, Г. Почепцов «Сучасні інформаційні війни». Видавничий дім «Києво-Могилянська Академія». 2015 ("Modern Information Wars"). Kyiv-Mohyla Academy Publishing House. 2015 (in Ukrainian)
 Прокремлівські ЗМІ про Україну та інтерпретація ними фашизму (огляд дезінформації) // Радіо свобода (Pro-Kremlin media about Ukraine and their interpretation of fascism (review of misinformation)) // Radio Liberty, July 24, 2017 (in Ukrainian)
 Andriy Soshnikov (Андрій Сошніков), За зламом пошти Бабченка стояли люди з «ДНР», які знімали фейки про бойовиків «ІД» // BBC, (Behind the hacking of Babchenko's mail were people from the DNR, who filmed fakes about IS militants) // October 4, 2018 (in Ukrainian)
 Tkach VF (Ткач В. Ф.), Спецпропаганда як інформаційний складник гібридної війни Росії проти України (Special propaganda as an information component of Russia's hybrid war against Ukraine) // Strategic Priorities (Стратегічні пріоритети). National Institute for Strategic Studies (Національний інститут стратегічних досліджень), 2016. Vol. 38. ISSN 2306-5664 (in Ukrainian) 
 Zolotukhin D. Yu. Біла книга спеціальних інформаційних операцій проти України 2014 – 2018  (White book of special information operations against Ukraine 2014–2018). 2018. 384pp. ISBN 978-966-97732-2-7 (in Ukrainian)

 In English 
 Jolanta Darczewska, (May 19, 2015). The devil is in the details. Information warfare in the light of Russia's military doctrine. Point of View. Ośrodek Studiów Oriental. ISBN 978-83-62936-57-1
 Jolanta Darczewska, (May 22, 2014). The anatomy of Russian information warfare. The Crimean operation, a case study. Point of View. Ośrodek Studiów Oriental. ISBN 978-83-62936-45-8
 David Frum, The Great Russian Disinformation Campaign // The Atlantic, July 1, 2018
 Keir Gilles. Handbook of Russian Information Warfare. Fellowship Monograph 9. NATO Defense College. ISBN 978-88-96898-16-1
 Alexei Minakov, Top 10 fakes of Russian propaganda for 2017 // InformNapalm, January 5, 2018
 Ellen Nakashima, Inside a Russian disinformation campaign in Ukraine in 2014 (in English)(переклад) // Washington Post, December 25, 2017
 Christopher Paul, Miriam Matthews, (2016). The Russian "Firehose of Falsehood" Propaganda Model. Perspectives. RAND Corporation. P.16. doi: 10.7249/PE198.
 Bret Perry, Non-Linear Warfare in Ukraine: The Critical Role of Information Operations and Special Operations (English) // Small Wars Journal, 14.08.2015
 Peter Pomerantsev, Michael Weiss, (October 22, 2014). The Menace of Unreality: How the Kremlin Weaponizes Information, Culture and Money. Institute of Modern Russia. p. 44.
 Katri Pynnöniemi, András Rácz, ed. (May 10, 2015). Fog of Falsehood. Russian Strategy of Deception and the Conflict in Ukraine . FIIA Report 45. The Finnish Institute of International Affairs. ISBN 978-951-769-486-5. ISSN 2323-5454. Archive of the original on June 22, 2016. Cited December 6, 2016. 
 András Rácz, (June 16, 2015). Russia's Hybrid War in Ukraine: Breaking the Enemy's Ability to Resist . FIIA Report 43. The Finnish Institute of International Affairs. ISBN 978-951-769-453-7. ISSN 2323-5454. Archive of the original on December 22, 2016. Cited December 6, 2016.
 Maria Snegovaya, (2015). Putin's information warfare in Ukraine. Soviet origins of Russia's hybrid warfare. Russia Report 1. Institute for the Study of War. 
 Andriy Soshnikov, Inside a pro-Russia propaganda machine in Ukraine BBC, 13 November 2017
 Aric Toler, Непостійні, взаємно-суперечливі історії Кремля щодо MH-17 // Bellingcat, (The Kremlin's Volatile, Contradictory MH-17 Stories) // Bellingcat, January 5, 2018 (in English)
 Tetyana Voropaeva (Тетяна Воропаєва), Информационная безопасность как фактор укрепления обороноспособности украины // (Information Security as a Factor of Strengthening Ukraine's Defense Capabilities) (in Russian) // gisap.eu 
 Mariia Zhdanova, University of Glasgow and Dariya Orlova, European Journalism Observatory. Computational Propaganda in Ukraine: Caught Between External Threats and Internal Challenges. Working Paper. 2017.9. Project on Computational Propaganda
 Dmitry Zolotukhin (Дмитро Золотухін), Біла книга спеціальних інформаційних операцій проти України 2014 – 2018 (Kremlin Fakes: Why Mr. Putin Links ISIS to Ukraine?) (in English) (Russian) // May 25, 2018 (in English)
 Committee on Foreign Relations, (2018). Putin's asymmetric assault on democracy in Russia and Europe: Implications for US national security. US Government Publishing Office.
 Russian Social Media Influence. Understanding Russian Propaganda in Eastern Europe. Research Reports. RAND Corporation''. 2018. pp. 148. ISBN 9780833099570. doi: 10.7249/RR2237. RR-2237-OSD.

References

Further reading 

 Bowen, Andrew S. Russian Military Intelligence: Background and Issues for Congress, docket #R46616, Congressional Research Service, 15 November 2021
 Cunningham, Conor A Russian Federation Information Warfare Primer, Henry M. Jackson School of International Studies, University of Washington, 12 November 2020
 
 
 

Russian–Ukrainian cyberwarfare
Information operations and warfare
Ukraine articles needing expert attention
Disinformation operations
Propaganda by war
Propaganda in Russia